Hilarión Osorio (1928 – 1990) was a Paraguayan football forward who played for Paraguay in the 1950 FIFA World Cup. He also played for Club Sportivo Luqueño.

Trajectory
Player of the Club Sportivo Luqueño, for the Paraguay in the 1950 FIFA World Cup and the 1956 South American Championship

References

External links
FIFA profile

Paraguayan footballers
Paraguay international footballers
Association football forwards
1950 FIFA World Cup players
1928 births
1990 deaths